Pär Styf (born April 11, 1979) is a Swedish former professional ice hockey defenceman who played for the Timrå IK hockey team in the Swedish Elitserien league. He was selected in the ninth round of the 1997 NHL Entry Draft, 240th overall by the Philadelphia Flyers, but spent his entire career with Timrå.

References

Styf retires (Swedish)

External links
 

1979 births
Living people
People from Sollefteå Municipality
Philadelphia Flyers draft picks
Swedish ice hockey defencemen
Timrå IK players
Sportspeople from Västernorrland County